Deerfield School is a historic public school building located at Deerfield, Augusta County, Virginia. The original section was built in 1937, and is a frame building consisting of an auditorium/gymnasium as the core of the building with rectangular gabled blocks on either side containing two rooms with the projecting gable ends.  A cinder block cafeteria / kitchen addition was built in 1948–1949, and a cinder block gymnasium / play room was added in 1979.

It was listed on the National Register of Historic Places in 1986.

References

School buildings on the National Register of Historic Places in Virginia
School buildings completed in 1937
Schools in Augusta County, Virginia
National Register of Historic Places in Augusta County, Virginia
1937 establishments in Virginia